The Homebrew Computer Club was an early computer hobbyist group in Menlo Park, California, which met from March 1975 to December 1986. The club had an influential role in the development of the microcomputer revolution and the rise of that aspect of the Silicon Valley information technology industrial complex.

Several high-profile hackers and computer entrepreneurs emerged from its ranks, including Steve Jobs and Steve Wozniak, the founders of Apple Computer. With its newsletter and monthly meetings promoting an open exchange of ideas, the club has been described as "the crucible for an entire industry" as it pertains to personal computing.

History

The Homebrew Computer Club was an informal group of electronic enthusiasts and technically minded hobbyists who gathered to trade parts, circuits, and information pertaining to DIY construction of personal computing devices. It was started by Gordon French and Fred Moore who met at the Community Computer Center in Menlo Park. They both were interested in maintaining a regular, open forum for people to get together to work on making computers more accessible to everyone.

The first meeting of the club was held on March 5, 1975, in French's garage in Menlo Park, San Mateo County, California, on the occasion of the arrival in the area of the first Micro Instrumentation and Telemetry Systems (MITS) Altair 8800 microcomputer, a unit sent for review by People's Computer Company. Steve Wozniak credits that first meeting as the inspiration to design the Apple I. The next few meetings were held at a large home in Atherton, California, which had been used as a preschool.  Subsequent meetings were held at an auditorium at the Stanford Linear Accelerator Center (SLAC), until 1978, when meetings moved to the Stanford Medical School.

An anecdote from member Thomas "Todd" Fischer relates that after the more-or-less "formal" meetings the participants often reconvened for an informal, late night "swap meet" in the parking lot of the Safeway store down the road, as SLAC campus rules prohibited such activity on campus property.  Others, at the suggestion of Roger Melen, convened at The Oasis, a bar and grill they considered a pub located on El Camino Real in nearby Menlo Park, recalled years later by a member as "Homebrew's other staging area". As Steven Levy wrote about the Oasis gatherings:

The Oasis closed on March 7, 2018, due to unaffordable rent. Its Menlo Park building is a historical landmark; in 2019 the building became home to a venture capital firm, Pear Ventures.

The 1999 made-for-television movie Pirates of Silicon Valley (and the book on which it is based, Fire in the Valley: The Making of the Personal Computer) describes the role the Homebrew Computer Club played in creating the first personal computers, although the movie took the liberty of placing the meeting in Berkeley and misrepresented the meeting process.

Many of the original members of the Homebrew Computer Club continue to meet, having formed the 6800 Club, named after the Motorola (now Freescale) 6800 microprocessor. Occasionally and variously renamed after the release of the 6800, 6809, and other microprocessors, the group continues to meet monthly in Cupertino, California.

Members

Most of the members were hobbyists but had an electronic engineering or computer programming background. They came to the meetings to talk about the Altair 8800, to review other technical topics, and to exchange schematics and programming tips.

From the ranks of this club came the founders of many microcomputer companies, including Steve Wozniak and Steve Jobs (Apple Computer), Harry Garland and Roger Melen (Cromemco), Thomas "Todd" Fischer (IMSAI Division, Fischer-Freitas Company), George Morrow (Morrow Designs), Paul Terrell (Byte Shop), Adam Osborne (Osborne Computer), and Bob Marsh (Processor Technology). John Draper was also a member of the club, as was Jerry Lawson (creator of the first cartridge-based video game system, Fairchild Channel F). Li-Chen Wang, developer of Palo Alto Tiny Basic and graphics software for the Cromemco Dazzler, was also a club member, and Lee Felsenstein was moderator of the club meetings. Steve Inness was a primary designer of one of the early cell phone touch screens as well as a business partner with John Draper. Liza Loop was also an early member and the first woman to join.

Others went on to other pursuits, such as Dan Werthimer who is a researcher in the search for extraterrestrial intelligence.

Newsletter

The Homebrew Computer Club's newsletter was one of the most influential forces in the formation of the culture of Silicon Valley. Created and edited by its members, it initiated the idea of the personal computer, and helped its members build the original kit computers, like the Altair. One such influential event was the publication of Bill Gates's "Open Letter to Hobbyists", which lambasted the early hackers of the time for violating the copyrights of commercial software programs.

Paul Terrell, partner in Repco who was the exclusive sales rep company for MITS in Northern California, was a member of the club and would provide information at the meetings about the progress of the Altair 8800 in the factory and provide copies of the MITS Newsletter to members. He later started Byte Shop, an affordable computer store in Mountain View, California, and bought the first 50 Apple I Computers from Steve Jobs and Steve Wozniak after they did a demonstration of the Apple I at a meeting at SLAC.

The first issue of the newsletter was published on March 15, 1975, and continued through several designs, ending after 21 issues in December 1977. The newsletter was published from a variety of addresses in the early days, but later submissions went to a P.O. box address in Mountain View, California.

The second volume began on January 31, 1976, and included sections for A LETTER FROM MITS, CASSETTE UPDATE, TINY BASIC, MEETING FACILITIES, SOFTWARE, PROBLEMS, MEETING-1, and ALTAIR 680.

In popular culture
The club is depicted in the films Pirates of Silicon Valley (1999) and Jobs (2013), as well as in the PBS documentary series Triumph of the Nerds (1996). However the depiction of how the club worked was not entirely accurate.

See also
 Adam Osborne
Berkeley Macintosh User Group
 Boston Computer Society
 Chaos Computer Club, a large and influential German club
 Computer History Museum
 Dr. Dobb's Journal
 Hackers: Heroes of the Computer Revolution
 Hobby Computer Club
 Kilobaud Microcomputing
 West Coast Computer Faire

References

External links

Steve Wozniak's home page
The Netherlands Home Computer Club website (in Dutch)
 Homebrew Computer Club Newsletters
 Homebrew Computer Club Newsletters as searchable PDFs
 Life Outside the Mainframe: Remembering Fred Moore
 Homebrew Computer Club on Jolitz Heritage site
 Lee Felsenstein and the Homebrew Computer Club, A History of Free Hardware Design
 The Beginning of the Apple Corps of Dallas (January 1978) Thru the Eyes of a Founding Member
 The Homebrew Computer Club 2013 Reunion

1975 establishments in California
1986 disestablishments in California
Computer clubs
Hacker culture
Organizations established in 1975
Organizations disestablished in 1986